Thioredoxin-like protein 1 is a protein that in humans is encoded by the TXNL1 gene.

References

Further reading